St. Pierre Cathedral is an early 20th-century church that served as the cathedral of the Roman Catholic Vicariate Apostolic of Iles Saint Pierre and Miquelon before it was dissolved in 2018. It is now part of the Roman Catholic Diocese of La Rochelle and Saintes. The church is located close to the harbour front of the capital city on the rue Jacques Cartier.

The construction of the church began in the late 17th century and it opened in 1690.  Due to renovations and reconstruction, the current structure dates back to 1907.  The church is noted for containing stained glass windows that were donated by Charles de Gaulle.

History
In 1668, French settlers began inhabiting the islands, bringing their Catholic faith along with them.  Construction of the cathedral most likely started after this time and it was completed in 1690.  The building remained standing until November 1902, when it was obliterated—along with the majority of the town—in the Great Fire, which originated from the cathedral.  St. Pierre was subsequently rebuilt from 1905 to 1907 using Basque-style architecture.

Architecture

Exterior
St. Pierre Cathedral was built in the Basque style of architecture and is noted for its mixture of European and local Saint-Pierrais features in its design.  This is demonstrated in the church's incorporation of Alsatian sandstone and native pink granite.

When the cathedral was rebuilt in 1905, the reconstruction used cement—an innovative construction material at the time.  However, this did not withstand the elements well and resulted in damage to the exterior walls.  As a result, restoration was undertaken in 1975, with the belfry being completely rebuilt.

Stained glass windows
The church contains both early 20th century and modern stained glass windows.  The former depicts saints from France—St. Marguerite Marie Alacoque, St. Bernadette and Our Lady of Lourdes—as well as the cathedral's namesake in Montmartre, whose architectural style was emulated by the cathedral.  The modern windows were given by Charles de Gaulle during his 1967 visit to the overseas territory.  These show scenes from the Gospel involving the sea and ships—a symbol of the islands depicted on their unofficial flag—as well as Pope John XXIII convening the Second Vatican Council.

See also
Roman Catholic Vicariate Apostolic of Iles Saint Pierre and Miquelon
Roman Catholic Diocese of La Rochelle and Saintes

References

External links

Catholic Church in Saint Pierre and Miquelon
Roman Catholic cathedrals in Saint Pierre and Miquelon
Roman Catholic churches completed in 1907
Saint-Pierre, Saint Pierre and Miquelon
1690 establishments in the French colonial empire
20th-century Roman Catholic church buildings in France